This is a list of the second-level administrative divisions of the Kingdom of Morocco including all provinces and prefectures in descending order of their total populations as per the Census Report of 2004.

 population
Administrative divisions